Homestead is a small unincorporated community in northern Blaine County, Oklahoma, United States. The town was platted along the Choctaw Northern Railroad (later the Rock Island) before statehood.  The Homestead Post Office opened January 26, 1893. Homestead had a population of 150 residents in 1905, according to the Oklahoma Territorial Census.  The town lost rail service around 1926.

Demographics

References

Further reading
 Shirk, George H. Oklahoma Place Names. Norman: University of Oklahoma Press, 1987.  .

Unincorporated communities in Blaine County, Oklahoma
Unincorporated communities in Oklahoma